Anne Émond (born 1982) is a Canadian film director and screenwriter, currently based in Montreal, Quebec.

Early life and education
Born in 1982, Anne Émond has lived and worked in Montreal since 2001. In 2005, she completed her undergraduate program in cinema at Université du Québec à Montréal (UQAM).

Career 
Since then, she wrote and directed seven short films including L'Ordre des choses (2009), Naissances (2009), Sophie Lavoie (2009) and Plus rien ne vouloir (2011). L'Ordre des choses won the Coop Vidéo Price for Best Director in 2009 at the Rendez-vous du cinéma québécois. It was also nominated for the Claude Jutra Award. Naissances was chosen as one of the Toronto International Film Festival's top ten short films of 2009 and was nominated at the Brooklyn International Film Festival. Émond's short film Sophie Lavoie won the best short-film for the Festival du Nouveau Cinema.

Her debut feature film, Nuit #1, succeeded in cementing her personal style – a style characterized by long takes, theatrical monologues, and thematics such as youth loneliness and women sexuality. Émond won the Claude Jutra Award for the year's best feature film by a first-time director at the 2012 Genie Awards.

Her second feature film, Our Loved Ones (Les êtres chers), premiered to positive reviews at the Locarno Film Festival in August 2015, and had its Canadian premiere at the 2015 Toronto International Film Festival. The story begins in 1978 in a small village on the Lower St. Lawrence, as the Leblanc family is rocked by the tragic death of Guy. In December, the film was announced as part of TIFF's annual Canada's Top Ten screening series of the ten best Canadian feature films of the year.

In 2016 Émond received the Stella Artois Jay Scott Prize, awarded to an emerging artist by the Toronto Film Critics Association, for Our Loved Ones. The film received seven Quebec Cinema Award nominations at the 18th Quebec Cinema Awards, for Best Film, Best Direction, Best Screenplay, Best Actor (Maxim Gaudette), Best Art Direction, Best Editing, and Best Hairstyling.

Her third film, Nelly is based on the life of Canadian novelist Nelly Arcan.

In 2017 she was the patron and curator of the Festival Vues dans la tête de... film festival in Rivière-du-Loup.

Filmography

Awards and honors
2012: Claude Jutra Award for Best First Film, Nuit #1, Academy of Canadian Cinema and Television
23rd Palm Springs International Film Festival, USA, 2012
10th Pune International Film Festival, Inde, 2012
35th Göteborg International Film Festival, Suède, 2012
11th !F Istanbul International Independent Film Festival, Turkie, 2012
27th Guadalajara International Film Festival, Mexique, 2012
41st Rotterdam International Film Festival, Pays-Bas, 2012
15e Cinéma du Québec à Paris, France, 2011
31e Festival International du film d'Amiens, France, 2011
28e Festival international du film francophone de Tübingen, Stuttgart, Allemagne, 2011
45th Hof International Film Festival, Allemagne, 2011
40e Festival du nouveau cinéma, Montréal, Québec, 2011
16th Busan International Film Festival, Corée du Sud, 2011
36th Toronto International Film Festival, Canada, 2011
40e Festival du nouveau Cinéma à Montréal, Canada, 2011
2011: "Shaw Media Award, best canadian film, Nuit #1, Vancouver International Film Festival"
Jury Price, Best Film - 25e Festival international du cinéma francophone en Acadie, Moncton
Pyrénée Best Actress (Catherine De Léan) Festival international du Film de Pau / Cinéma Le Méliès
Nomination Prix génie 2012 de l'Académie Canadienne du cinéma et de la télévision pour la meilleure actrice (Catherine De Léan)

See also
 List of female film and television directors
 List of LGBT-related films directed by women

References

External links

Anne Émond, MUBI

1982 births
Film directors from Montreal
Writers from Montreal
Canadian women screenwriters
Living people
Best First Feature Genie and Canadian Screen Award winners
Canadian women film directors
Canadian screenwriters in French
People from Chaudière-Appalaches